Harold E. West (10 December 1899 – 7 August 1973) was a British rower who competed in the 1928 Summer Olympics. West was a member of Thames Rowing Club. In 1928 he was a member of the first eight, which won the Grand Challenge Cup at Henley Royal Regatta and then represented Great Britain rowing at the 1928 Summer Olympics.

References

External links
 

1899 births
1973 deaths
British male rowers
Olympic rowers of Great Britain
Rowers at the 1928 Summer Olympics
Olympic silver medallists for Great Britain
Olympic medalists in rowing
Medalists at the 1928 Summer Olympics